These are the official results of the Women's Heptathlon competition at the 2003 World Championships in Paris, France. There were a total number of 22 participating athletes, including four non-finishers. The competition started on Saturday 23 August 2003 and ended on Sunday 24 August 2003.

Medalists

Schedule

Saturday, August 23, 2003

Sunday, August 24, 2003

Records

Results

See also
 2003 Hypo-Meeting
 Athletics at the 2003 Pan American Games - Women's heptathlon

References
 Results
 IAAF Statistics Handbook Daegu 2011, Part 3 of 5, Page 266

D
Heptathlon at the World Athletics Championships
2003 in women's athletics